The Mitsubishi 2G1 engine is a water-cooled iron-block two-stroke twin-cylinder engine built by Mitsubishi Motors for the kei car class from 1968. They were first introduced in the first generation Minica to replace (and to complement) the otherwise similar but air-cooled ME24 powerplant. The difference of nomenclature compared to the ME24 is due to Mitsubishi's 1967 change of engine naming practice, 2G1 meaning it was in the first family of two-cylinder gasoline-powered engines. The "0" in "2G10" means that it was the first displacement version produced, with numbers after a dash (e.g. 2G10-5) then denoting the various subiterations.

The 2G10 engine was replaced by the 2G21 "Vulcan" engine, a four-stroke unit of identical displacement which first appeared in September 1972. The two-stroke 2G10 did continue to be produced as a low-cost alternative until new Kei car regulations took effect in January 1976, mainly for commercial vehicles.

2G10

Specifications

Applications
1968-69 Mitsubishi Minica LA23
1969-76 Mitsubishi Minica A101/101V
1972-76 Mitsubishi Minicab W

See also
List of Mitsubishi engines

References

2G1
Straight-twin engines